"Crash Landed" is the second single from pop music project Sweetbox on the album The Next Generation, featuring Jamie Pineda as frontwoman. Georgie Dennis, Tom Barnes, Gavin Jones, Ben Kohn and Peter Kelleher co-wrote the song with Jamie.

The song samples Bach's Toccata & Fuge in D minor.

Crash Landed was released in Japan as the second single in July 2009 and the third single in Korea in April 2010. The Korean digital download also included the Wedding Mix of We Can Work It Out. While Crash Landed had no major success in Japan on charts like the single prior to it, the song received quite a bit of radio play. In Korea the song peaked at #12 on the International Gaon Charts.

Music video
The Crash Landed video premiered on July 28, 2009, and featured a new mix in the song for the video. Like Jamie's first video for We Can Work It Out, this too was directed by Martin Häusler and Martin Linss. The concept of the video features Jamie in an elevator while it presumably crashes down. The video also features four back-up dancers in the background while Jamie sings in front of them.

Track list

References

2009 singles
Sweetbox songs
Songs written by Peter Kelleher (songwriter)
Songs written by Tom Barnes (songwriter)
Songs written by Ben Kohn
2009 songs
Warner Music Group singles
Songs written by Jamie Pineda